Thapaswini is a 1971 Indian Malayalam film, directed by M. Krishnan Nair and produced by P. I. M. Kasim. The film stars Prem Nazir, Sheela, Adoor Bhasi and Jose Prakash in the lead roles. The film had musical score by G. Devarajan.

Cast 

Prem Nazir
Sheela
Adoor Bhasi
Jose Prakash
Prema
Sankaradi
Raghavan
T. S. Muthaiah
K. P. Ummer
Philomina
Sujatha

Soundtrack 
The music was composed by G. Devarajan and the lyrics were written by Vayalar Ramavarma.

References

External links 
 

1971 films
1970s Malayalam-language films
Films directed by M. Krishnan Nair